The Any Day Now EP is Elbow's third release. This EP was released through Elbow's first record label Ugly Man Records, as well as their second record label V2 Records. Both EPs each have a different track listing.

The song "George Lassoes the Moon" on the Ugly Man Records version of the EP differs from the version on The Noisebox EP. Not only is it a minute shorter, but it also is musically more produced than the rough first version. "Wurzel" is an instrumental song.

Track listing

Ugly Man Records
"Any Day Now" – 5:56
"Wurzel" – 2:14
"George Lassoes the Moon" – 5:49
"Don't Mix Your Drinks" – 3:24
"Any Day Now" (Radio Edit) – 4:16

V2 Records
"Any Day Now" – 5:54
"Wurzel" – 2:12
"Don't Mix Your Drinks" – 3:14
"None One" – 3:45

2001 EPs
Elbow (band) albums